Shurahbil ibn Amr was a Ghassanid governor of the vassal Ghassanid confederation (authority) under the Byzantine Empire in southern Syria region during the 7th century. He is also known to have arrested and killed the envoy of Muhammad, Harith ibn Amr Al-Azdi, who had a letter for the Ghassanid governor of Bosra, Harith bin Abi Shimr al-Ghassani.

References

7th-century Arabs
7th century in the Byzantine Empire
Arab history
7th-century monarchs in the Middle East
Ghassanids